Tom Clancy's Splinter Cell: Pandora Tomorrow is a 2004 stealth video game developed and published by Ubisoft Shanghai and Ubisoft Milan. It is the second game in the Splinter Cell series endorsed by writer Tom Clancy. The game follows the covert activities of Sam Fisher, an agent working for a black-ops branch of the National Security Agency (NSA) called "Third Echelon". Michael Ironside returns to voice Sam Fisher, while Dennis Haysbert voices the character Irving Lambert, Fisher's boss, making this the only time he is not voiced by Don Jordan. Lalo Schifrin provides the theme music for the game.

Pandora Tomorrow received very positive reviews on release, with critics calling it a strong follow-up and giving praise to its multiplayer component, which would become a staple of the series. A side-scrolling adaptation for Game Boy Advance and mobile phones was released to mixed reception. A remastered high definition version was released on PlayStation 3 in September 2011, and an Xbox version was made available for Xbox One via backward compatibility in June 2019.

Plot
In March 2006, the United States has established a military presence in the newly-independent country of East Timor to train the East Timorese military in their fight against anti-separatist Indonesian guerrilla militias. Foremost among these militias is the Darah Dan Doa, led by the charismatic Suhadi Sadono.

Sadono, once trained by the CIA to help fight communism in the region, has grown resentful of U.S. support of East Timor and its supposed interference with Indonesian sovereignty. Sadono orchestrates a suicide bombing and follow-up attack on the U.S. embassy in Dili, capturing a number of U.S. military and diplomatic personnel including Douglas Shetland, an old friend and comrade of Sam Fisher.

Meanwhile, Fisher is sent to infiltrate the embassy and gather intelligence on the Darah Dan Doa. Fisher succeeds in his mission, and the embassy is retaken by the U.S. Army's Delta Force. Sadono escapes, and the United States launches a military campaign in Indonesian territory in an attempt to hunt him down, much to the protests of the Indonesian government who is seeking to protect Sadono. 

Fisher discovers a connection between Sadono, someone known only as 'mortified_penguin' and a cryogenics lab in Paris. He infiltrates the lab as Syrian and French mercenaries hired by 'mortified_penguin' attack it to seize ND133 containers; self-contained cryogenic containers used for transporting and storing human brains. On a train in to Nice, Fisher discovers that 'mortified_penguin' is actually Norman Soth, a former CIA agent. 

Soth is heading to Jerusalem to procure something for Sadono's 'Insurance Policy', Fisher infiltrates the city to discover what the ND133 containers are for. In Jerusalem, Fisher meets with a Shin Bet undercover agent who reveals that Soth came to purchase bio-weapons from Syrian mercenaries. The Shin Bet betrays Fisher after he retrieves the ND133, planning to take the bio-weapon for themselves, but Fisher manages to kill or evade the Israeli agents.

Fisher learns that Sadono has masterminded a scheme known as "Pandora Tomorrow", by placing a series of ND133 biological bombs, equipped with the smallpox virus, on U.S. soil. Every 24 hours, Sadono makes encrypted phone calls to each of the bomb carriers to delay the release of the virus. If he is killed or detained, the virus is released and millions of Americans will die. Because Sadono is fighting on the front lines in the conflict, the U.S. cannot risk killing him outright, and is forced to withdraw its forces.

To prevent Sadono from taking advantage of the situation, Fisher is sent to infiltrate Darah Dan Doa strongholds in order to learn the location of the smallpox bombs so Sadono can be captured. He is assisted in this endeavor by Shetland and his private military company, Displace International. Fisher learns the location of the bombs, and Shadownet spies are sent in to neutralize them. After the bombs are disarmed, NSA's Third Echelon decides to capture Sadono alive instead of assassinating him, due to the problems created when Fisher assassinated former Georgian president Kombayn Nikoladze in late 2004.

Although Fisher manages to capture Sadono, Third Echelon learns that Soth has acquired the last smallpox-armed ND133 and intends to detonate it inside Los Angeles International Airport. Soth is motivated not by Indonesia, but by a perceived betrayal which resulted in the loss of a leg years prior, and intends to exact revenge on the United States. Fisher infiltrates the airport, kills Soth and his group of terrorists (disguised as airport workers and security guards), and prevents the detonation of the last smallpox-armed ND133 by disguising himself as a maintenance worker and setting the ND133 down behind two policemen, who notice the device almost immediately, and subsequently have the airport evacuated. The Los Angeles Police Department's bomb squad is then called in to perform a controlled explosion of the device, which is done by an automated vehicle armored with reinforced steel.

Gameplay

The gameplay of Pandora Tomorrow is largely unchanged from the original Splinter Cell. The game features some moderate graphical improvements, as well as minor gameplay changes such as the fact that health kits are no longer an inventory item, and the addition of a laser sight to Sam's pistol that allows the player to know exactly where the rounds will strike, even when moving around. Also, Sam can now whistle to attract enemies, open doors while carrying a body, shoot while hanging upside down, perform a "SWAT turn" to go past doorways unnoticed (move from one side of the door to other while covered), and perform a half split jump. In Chaos Theory, the next entry in the series, the SWAT turn was removed and the pistol laser was replaced with an OCP (Optically Channeled Potentiator) which can temporarily disable electronic devices. The PlayStation 2 and GameCube versions of Pandora Tomorrow also feature an additional single-player mission to compensate for the abridged gameplay compared to the PC and Xbox versions.

Development
Pandora Tomorrow was entitled Shadow Strike during its development.

Windows version
As with the original Splinter Cell, the Windows version is a port of the Xbox version and duplicated that version's user interface and gameplay. However, the Windows version can run at higher resolutions than the console versions. The "checkpoint" save system from the Xbox version was replaced with the ability to save a game at any time, and the controls were reworked to allow simultaneous use of a keyboard and mouse, with movement speed being controlled by the mouse wheel. None of the bonus content from the other versions is present on this version.

PlayStation 3
A PlayStation 3 version via PlayStation Network was announced on December 20, 2010 to be part of the Splinter Cell Trilogy which was released in September 2011 as part of Sony's Classics HD series. It was revealed on the PlayStation Blog that the game is a port of the PC version, which had better graphical detail than previous console versions. It was also revealed that the multiplayer modes are not included in the collection.

Game Boy Advance
The GBA version was released on March 24, 2004 in North America and March 26, 2004 in Europe.

Reception

By the end of March 2004, Tom Clancy's Splinter Cell: Pandora Tomorrow had sold 1.7 million copies. Its total sales reached 2.7 million units by the end of June, and rose to 2.8 million by September.

The game's reviews ranged from average to some describing the game as 'critically acclaimed', depending on the platform, according to video game review aggregator Metacritic. In addition, Rotten Tomatoes gave the game a score of 100% "Fresh Rating" for the Xbox version; a 95% "Fresh Rating" for the PS2 version; a 90% "Fresh Rating" for the PC version; a 55% "Rotten Rating" for the GameCube version; and a 27% "Rotten Rating" for the GBA version.

Greg Kasavin of GameSpot gave the Xbox and PC versions a score of 9.1 and said that the single-player and multiplayer portions of the game will appeal to anyone interested in high-tech stealth and subterfuge. He also said that players familiar with the first Splinter Cell should expect 10 hours or more of gameplay. Kasavin said the storyline in Pandora Tomorrow was more cohesive than the original Splinter Cell, but the gameplay often becomes pure trial and error, noting that the missions "could have benefited from feeling less rigid and scripted" but were "incredibly slick." Kasavin also praised the multiplayer mode for its innovation, complexity, and creativity.  Mongoose of Game Chronicles Magazine also gave the Xbox version a 9.4 out of 10 and gave special praise to the multiplayer portion of the game. He called the game "the single best reason to get online" on Xbox Live. However, he felt that gameplay in the single player campaign at times got increasingly linear and leaned toward scripted challenges, with "only one solution to any given problem", requiring "the use of a particular gadget or one of Sam’s nimble moves."

Entertainment Weekly gave the Xbox version an A and said that it "seems less like a sequel and more like an extension of the first game, with a few nice enhancements and some more dark and dangerous environments." Playboy gave the game 100% and stated that "A new online mode allows four players to stalk one another. Take an opponent hostage and use your headset to describe all the pain you plan to inflict on him." The Times gave it all five stars and called it "a miniature masterpiece". The Village Voice gave the Xbox version a perfect ten and said, "No multiplayer title has ever bound and balanced two wholly different games this way."

GameSpot named Pandora Tomorrow the best Xbox game of March 2004. The editors of Computer Gaming World nominated Pandora Tomorrow for their 2004 "Action Game of the Year" award, which ultimately went to The Chronicles of Riddick: Escape from Butcher Bay.

References

External links

 Official website via Internet Archive
 
 
 

2004 video games
Action-adventure games
Asymmetrical multiplayer video games
Game Boy Advance games
GameCube games
Games with GameCube-GBA connectivity
Interactive Achievement Award winners
Japan Self-Defense Forces in fiction
Multiplayer and single-player video games
Multiplayer online games
PlayStation 2 games
PlayStation 3 games
Stealth video games
Terrorism in fiction
Tom Clancy's Splinter Cell
Tom Clancy games
Ubisoft games
Unreal Engine games
Video games developed in Italy
Video games developed in China
Video games scored by Jack Wall
Video games set in 2006
Video games set in East Timor
Video games set in France
Video games set in Indonesia
Video games set in Jerusalem
Video games set in Los Angeles
Video games set in Paris
Windows games
Xbox games
Smallpox in fiction
Video games with alternative versions
D.I.C.E. Award for Action Game of the Year winners
D.I.C.E. Award for Adventure Game of the Year winners
Bioterrorism in fiction